China–Nicaragua relations are the bilateral relationship between China and Nicaragua. Official relations began in 1985, but were broken in 1990 as a result of Nicaragua's recognition of Taiwan. Relations were restored in 2021. China has an embassy in Managua and Nicaragua has an embassy in Beijing.

History 

During the Cold War, Nicaragua only maintained formal diplomatic relations with the Republic of China (Taiwan). The Xinhua News Agency opened a branch office in Managua after the Nicaraguan Revolution broke out in 1979. The Nicaraguan government, which was led by Daniel Ortega, first established formal relations with China in 1985, and both countries soon opened resident embassies in their respective capitals.

However, after a difficult presidency marred by war and economic collapse, Ortega was defeated in the 1990 Nicaraguan general election by Violeta Chamorro, who declared the restoration of diplomatic relations with Taiwan. China subsequently severed diplomatic relations. Additionally, Nicaragua shut down its consulate before the transfer of sovereignty of Hong Kong, which was established during British rule. In December 2021, Nicaragua suspended its relations with Taiwan, and restored its relations with China.

See also 
 Hong Kong–Nicaragua relations

References 

Nicaragua 
Bilateral relations of Nicaragua